Robert Wall (1939–2022) American martial artist and screen actor.

Robert Wall may also refer to:
Bob Wall (football administrator) (1912–1981), English former secretary and director of Arsenal Football Club
Bob Wall (ice hockey) (born 1942), Canadian ice hockey player

See also
Robert Walls (born 1950), Australian rules footballer